The British Union of Fascists (BUF) was a British fascist political party formed in 1932 by Oswald Mosley. Mosley changed its name to the British Union of Fascists and National Socialists in 1936 and, in 1937, to the British Union. In 1939, following the start of the Second World War, the party was proscribed by the British government and in 1940 it was disbanded.

The BUF emerged in 1932 from the electoral defeat of its antecedent, the New Party, in the 1931 general election. The BUF's foundation was initially met with popular support, and it attracted a sizeable following, with the party claiming 50,000 members at one point. The press baron Lord Rothermere was a notable early supporter. As the party became increasingly radical, however, support declined. The Olympia Rally of 1934, in which a number of anti-fascist protestors were attacked by the paramilitary wing of the BUF, the Fascist Defence Force, isolated the party from much of its following. The party's embrace of Nazi-style anti-semitism in 1936 led to increasingly violent anti-fascist confrontations, notably the 1936 Battle of Cable Street in London's East End. The Public Order Act 1936, which banned political uniforms and responded to increasing political violence, had a particularly strong effect on the BUF whose supporters were known as "Blackshirts" after the uniforms they wore.

Growing British hostility towards Nazi Germany, with which the British press persistently associated the BUF, further contributed to the decline of the movement's membership. It was finally banned by the British government on 23 May 1940 after the start of the Second World War, amid suspicion that its remaining supporters might form a pro-Nazi "fifth column". A number of prominent BUF members were arrested and interned under Defence Regulation 18B.

History

Background

Oswald Mosley was the youngest elected Conservative MP before crossing the floor in 1922, joining first Labour and, shortly afterward, the Independent Labour Party. He became Chancellor of the Duchy of Lancaster in Ramsay MacDonald's Labour government, advising on rising unemployment.

In 1930, Mosley issued his Mosley Memorandum, which fused protectionism with a proto-Keynesian programme of policies designed to tackle the problem of unemployment, and he resigned from the Labour Party soon after, in early 1931, when the plans were rejected. He immediately formed the New Party, with policies based on his memorandum. The party won 16% of the vote at a by-election in Ashton-under-Lyne in early 1931; however, it failed to achieve any other electoral success.

During 1931, the New Party became increasingly influenced by fascism. The following year, after a January 1932 visit to Benito Mussolini in Italy, Mosley's own conversion to fascism was confirmed. He wound up the New Party in April, but preserved its youth movement, which would form the core of the BUF, intact. He spent the summer that year writing a fascist programme, The Greater Britain, and this formed the basis of policy of the BUF, which was launched on 1 October 1932.

Early success and growth

The BUF claimed 50,000 members at one point, and the Daily Mail, running the headline "Hurrah for the Blackshirts!", was an early supporter. The first Director of Propaganda, appointed in February 1933, was Wilfred Risdon, who was responsible for organising all of Mosley's public meetings. Despite strong resistance from anti-fascists, including the local Jewish community, the Labour Party, the Independent Labour Party, and the Communist Party of Great Britain, the BUF found a following in the East End of London, where in the London County Council elections of March 1937, it obtained reasonably successful results in Bethnal Green, Shoreditch, and Limehouse, polling almost 8,000 votes, although none of its candidates was elected. The BUF did elect a few councillors at local government level during the 1930s (including Charles Bentinck Budd (Worthing, Sussex), 1934; Ronald Creasy (Eye, Suffolk), 1938) but did not win any parliamentary seats. Two former members of the BUF, Major Sir Jocelyn Lucas and Harold Soref, were later elected as Conservative Members of Parliament (MPs).

Having lost the funding of newspaper magnate Lord Rothermere that it had previously enjoyed, at the 1935 general election the party urged voters to abstain, calling for "Fascism Next Time". There never was a "next time" as the next general election was not held until July 1945, five years after the dissolution of the BUF.

Towards the middle of the 1930s, the BUF's violent clashes with opponents began to alienate some middle-class supporters, and membership decreased. At the Olympia rally in London, in 1934, BUF stewards violently ejected anti-fascist disrupters, and this led the Daily Mail to withdraw its support for the movement. The level of violence shown at the rally shocked many, with the effect of turning neutral parties against the BUF and contributing to anti-fascist support. One observer claimed: "I came to the conclusion that Mosley was a political maniac, and that all decent English people must combine to kill his movement."

In Belfast in April 1934 an autonomous wing of the party in Northern Ireland called the "Ulster Fascists" was founded. The branch was a failure and became virtually extinct after less than a year in existence. It had ties with the Blueshirts in the Irish Free State and voiced support for a United Ireland, describing the partition of Ireland as "an insurmountable barrier to peace, and prosperity in Ireland". Its logo was a fasces on a Red Hand of Ulster.

Decline and legacy
The BUF became more antisemitic over 1934–35 owing to the growing influence of Nazi sympathisers within the party, such as William Joyce and John Beckett, which provoked the resignation of members such as Dr. Robert Forgan. This anti-semitic emphasis and these high-profile resignations resulted in a significant decline in membership, dropping to below 8,000 by the end of 1935, and, ultimately, Mosley shifted the party's focus back to mainstream politics. There were frequent and continuous violent clashes between BUF party members and anti-fascist protesters, most famously at the Battle of Cable Street in October 1936, when organised anti-fascists prevented the BUF from marching through Cable Street. However, the party later staged other marches through the East End without incident, albeit not on Cable Street itself.

BUF support for Edward VIII and the peace campaign to prevent a second World War saw membership and public support rise once more. The government was sufficiently concerned by the party's growing prominence to pass the Public Order Act 1936, which banned political uniforms and required police consent for political marches.

In 1937, William Joyce and other Nazi sympathisers split from the party to form the National Socialist League, which quickly folded, with most of its members interned. Mosley later denounced Joyce as a traitor and condemned him for his extreme anti-semitism. The historian Stephen Dorril revealed in his book Blackshirts that secret envoys from the Nazis had donated about £50,000 to the BUF.

By 1939, total BUF membership had declined to just 20,000. On 23 May 1940, the BUF was banned outright by the government via Defence Regulation 18B and Mosley, along with 740 other fascists, was interned for much of the Second World War. After the war, Mosley made several unsuccessful attempts to return to politics, such as via the Union Movement.

Relationship with the suffragettes
Attracted by ‘modern’ fascist policies, such as ending the widespread practice of sacking women from their jobs on marriage, many women joined the Blackshirts – particularly in economically depressed Lancashire. Eventually women constituted one-quarter of the BUF's membership.

In a January 2010 BBC documentary, Mother Was A Blackshirt, James Maw reported that in 1914 Norah Elam was placed in a Holloway Prison cell with Emmeline Pankhurst for her involvement with the suffragette movement, and, in 1940, she was returned to the same prison with Diana Mosley, this time for her involvement with the fascist movement. Another leading suffragette, Mary Richardson, became head of the women's section of the BUF.

Mary Sophia Allen OBE was a former branch leader of the West of England Women's Social and Political Union (WSPU). At the outbreak of the First World War, she joined the Women Police Volunteers, becoming the WPV Commandant in 1920. She met Mosley at the January Club in April 1932, going on to speak at the club following her visit to Germany, "to learn the truth about of the position of German womanhood".

The BBC report described how Elam's fascist philosophy grew from her suffragette experiences, how the British fascist movement became largely driven by women, how they targeted young women from an early age, how the first British fascist movement was founded by a woman, and how the leading lights of the suffragettes had, with Oswald Mosley, founded the BUF.

Mosley's electoral strategy had been to prepare for the election after 1935, and in 1936 he announced a list of BUF candidates for that election, with Elam nominated to stand for Northampton. Mosley accompanied Elam to Northampton to introduce her to her electorate at a meeting in the Town Hall. At that meeting Mosley announced that "he was glad indeed to have the opportunity of introducing the first candidate, and ... [thereby] killed for all time the suggestion that National Socialism proposed putting British women back into the home; this is simply not true. Mrs Elam [he went on] had fought in the past for women's suffrage ... and was a great example of the emancipation of women in Britain."

Former suffragettes were drawn to the BUF for a variety of reasons. Many felt the movement's energy reminded them of the suffragettes, while others felt the BUF's economic policies would offer them true equality – unlike its continental counterparts, the movement insisted it would not require women to return to domesticity and that the corporatist state would ensure adequate representation for housewives, while it would also guarantee equal wages for women and remove the marriage bar that restricted the employment of married women. The BUF also offered support for new mothers (due to concerns of falling birth rates), while also offering effective birth control, as Mosley believed it was not in the national interest to have a populace ignorant of modern scientific knowledge. While these policies were motivated more out of making the best use of women's skills in state interest than any kind of feminism, it was still a draw for many suffragettes.

Prominent members and supporters
Despite the short period of its operation the BUF attracted prominent members and supporters. These included:
 William Edward David Allen was previously Unionist Member of Parliament for Belfast West. Material in the National Archive shows that Allen acted as an MI5 agent within the BUF.
 John Beckett was previously Labour Member of Parliament for Peckham.
 Frank Bossard was an officer in the RAF and, after the war, a Soviet spy.
 Patrick Boyle, 8th Earl of Glasgow was a member of the House of Lords.
 Malcolm Campbell was a racing motorist and motoring journalist.
 A. K. Chesterton was a journalist.
 Lady Cynthia Curzon (known as 'Cimmie') was the second daughter of George Curzon, Lord Curzon of Kedleston, and the wife of Oswald Mosley until her death in 1933.
 Robert Forgan was previously Labour Member of Parliament for West Renfrewshire.
 Major General John Frederick Charles Fuller was a military historian and strategist.
 Billy Fullerton was leader of the Billy Boys gang from Glasgow.
 Arthur Gilligan was the captain of the England cricket team.
 Reginald Goodall was an English conductor.
 Group Captain Louis Greig was a British naval surgeon, courtier and intimate of King George VI.
 Jeffrey Hamm was a prominent member and later Mosley's personal secretary.
 Harold Sidney Harmsworth, 1st Viscount Rothermere, was the owner of the Daily Mail and a member of the House of Lords.
 Neil Francis Hawkins was leader of the Blackshirts.
 Josslyn Hay, 22nd Earl of Erroll, was a member of the House of Lords.
 William Joyce, later nicknamed 'Lord Haw-Haw', became naturalized as a German citizen and broadcast pro-Nazi propaganda from German territory.
 Ted "Kid" Lewis was a Jewish boxing champion; he left the party after it became overtly anti-Semitic.
 David Freeman-Mitford, 2nd Baron Redesdale, was a member of the House of Lords. His wife, Lady Redesdale, and two of his daughters were also members:
 Diana Mitford (Lady Mosley, after her marriage to Sir Oswald Mosley in 1936)
 Unity Mitford was an associate of Hitler.
 Tommy Moran was a BUF leader in Derby and later south Wales.
 St John Philby was an explorer, and the father of Kim Philby.
 Sir Alliott Verdon Roe was a pilot and businessman.
 Edward Frederick Langley Russell, 2nd Baron Russell of Liverpool, was a member of the House of Lords.
 His wife Lady Russell was also a member.
 Edward Russell, 26th Baron de Clifford, was a member of the House of Lords.
 Hastings Russell, 12th Duke of Bedford, was a member of the House of Lords.
 Alexander Raven Thomson was the party's Director of Public Policy.
 Frank Cyril Tiarks, of German extraction, was a banker, a Director of the Bank of England and a prominent member of the Anglo-German Fellowship. 
 His wife, Emmy née Brödermann, was also a member.
 Frederick Toone was the manager of the England cricket team and Yorkshire Cricket Club.
 Henry Williamson was a writer, best known for his 1927 work Tarka the Otter.

In popular culture

 The Channel 4 television serial Mosley (1998) portrayed the career of Oswald Mosley during his years with the BUF. The four-part series was based on the books Rules of the Game and Beyond the Pale, written by his son Nicholas Mosley.
 In the film It Happened Here (1964), the BUF appears to be the ruling party of German-occupied Britain. A Mosley speech is heard on the radio in the scene before everyone goes to the movies.
 The first depiction of Mosley and the BUF in fiction occurred in Aldous Huxley's novel Point Counter Point (1932), in which Mosley is depicted as Everard Webley, the murderous leader of the "BFF", the Brotherhood of Free Fascists; he comes to a nasty end.
 The BUF has been featured in several novels by Harry Turtledove.
 In his alternative history novel In the Presence of Mine Enemies, set in 2010 in a world in which the Nazis were triumphant, the BUF led by Prime Minister Charlie Lynton governs Britain. It is here that the first stirrings of the reform movement appear.
 In the Southern Victory series, set in a reality in which the Confederate States of America became independent and the Central Powers (including the United States) won that reality's analogue of the First World War, the "Silver Shirts" (analogous to the BUF) entered into a coalition with the Conservatives who were led by Churchill with Mosley being appointed Chancellor of the Exchequer.
 The BUF and Mosley also appear as background influences in Turtledove's Colonization trilogy which follows the Worldwar tetralogy and is set in the 1960s.
 Pink Floyd's album The Wall (1979) features BUF Blackshirts, particularly in the song "Waiting for the Worms" in which the protagonist of the conceptual album has a drug induced delusion that he is the leader of the resurgence of the BUF's Blackshirts.
 James Herbert's novel '48 (1996) has a protagonist who is hunted by BUF Blackshirts in a devastated London after a biological weapon is released during the Second World War. The history of the BUF and Mosley is recapitulated.
 In Ken Follett's novel Night Over Water, several of the main characters are BUF members. In his book Winter of the World, the Battle of Cable Street plays a role and some of the characters are involved in either the BUF or the anti-BUF organisations.
 The BUF also appears in Guy Walters' book The Leader (2003), in which Mosley is the dictator of Britain in the 1930s.
 The British humorous writer P. G. Wodehouse satirized the BUF in books and short stories. The BUF was satirized as "The Black Shorts" (shorts were worn because all of the best shirt colours were already taken) and its leader was Roderick Spode, the owner of a ladies' underwear shop.
 The British novelist Nancy Mitford satirized the BUF and Mosley in Wigs on the Green (1935). Diana Mitford, the author's sister, had been romantically involved with Mosley since 1932.
 In the 1992 Acorn Media production of Agatha Christie's One, Two, Buckle My Shoe with David Suchet and Philip Jackson, one of the supporting characters (played by Christopher Eccleston) secures a paid position as a rank-and-file member of the BUF.
 The BUF and Oswald Mosley are alluded to in Kazuo Ishiguro's novel The Remains of the Day.
 The BUF and Mosley are shown in the BBC version of Upstairs, Downstairs (2010) in which two of the characters are BUF supporters.
 The Pogues' song "The Sick Bed of Cuchulainn", from their album Rum Sodomy & the Lash (1985), refers to the BUF in its second verse with the line "And you decked some fucking blackshirt who was cursing all the Yids".
 Ned Beauman's first novel, Boxer, Beetle (2010), portrays the Battle of Cable Street.
 C. J. Samson's novel Dominion (2012) has Sir Oswald Mosley as Home Secretary in a "post-Dunkirk peace with Germany alternate history thriller" set in 1952. Lord Beaverbrook is Prime Minister of an authoritarian coalition government. Blackshirts tend to be auxiliary policemen.
 In the film The King's Speech (2010), a brief shot shows a brick wall in London plastered with posters, some of them reading "Fascism is Practical Patriotism" and others reading "Stand by the King". Both sets of posters were put up by British Blackshirts, who supported King Edward VIII. Edward was suspected of fascist leanings.
 Sarah Phelps used the British Union of Fascists' insignia as a theme in her 2018 BBC One adaptation of Agatha Christie's The A.B.C. Murders.
 Amanda K. Hale's novel Mad Hatter (2019) features her father James Larratt Battersby as a member of the BUF.
 Mosley was portrayed by Sam Claflin in Series 5 and 6 of the BBC show Peaky Blinders as the founder of the BUF.
 The legacy of BUF is a theme of the final episode of season 8 of the detective series Father Brown.

Election results

See also
 List of British fascist parties
 Mosley (1997)
 The flash and circle symbol
 Battle of South Street – an incident between BUF members and anti-fascists in Worthing on 9 October 1934

References

Further reading
 Caldicott, Rosemary (2017) Lady Blackshirts. The perils of Perception - Suffragettes who became Fascists, Bristol Radical Pamphletteer #39. 
 
 
 Drabik, Jakub. (2016a) "British Union of Fascists", Contemporary British History 30.1 (2016): 1–19.
 Drábik, Jakub. (2016b) "Spreading the faith: the propaganda of the British Union of Fascists", Journal of Contemporary European Studies (2016): 1-15.
 Garau, Salvatore. "The Internationalisation of Italian Fascism in the face of German National Socialism, and its Impact on the British Union of Fascists", Politics, Religion & Ideology 15.1 (2014): 45–63.
 
 
 

1932 establishments in the United Kingdom
1940 disestablishments in the United Kingdom
Antisemitism in the United Kingdom
Banned far-right parties
Defunct political parties in the United Kingdom
Fascist parties in the United Kingdom
Oswald Mosley
Political parties disestablished in 1940
Political parties established in 1932
Racism in the United Kingdom
National syndicalism
Fascist parties